Leninske, known officially as Valianivske since 2016, is an urban-type settlement in Dovzhanskk Raion (district) in Luhansk Oblast of eastern Ukraine. Population:

Demographics
Native language distribution as of the Ukrainian Census of 2001:
 Ukrainian: 7.16%
 Russian: 92.05%
 Others 0.26%

References

Urban-type settlements in Dovzhansk Raion